"Waterfall" is a song written and performed by Carly Simon, and produced by Richard Perry. The song served as the second single from Simon's fifth studio album, Playing Possum (1975).

Waterfall was not as successful on the Billboard Pop singles chart as its predecessor "Attitude Dancing", peaking only at No. 78. However, it was much more successful on the Billboard Adult Contemporary chart, reaching a peak position of No. 21.

Cash Box called it "a strong ballad with an introverted lyric." Record World said that it's "most refreshing and free-flowing Simon sound that's splashin' with style."

Simon later included the track on her two disc career retrospective set Anthology, released in 2002. James Taylor provides backing vocals on the track. Simon plays the piano on the track.

Track listing
7" single
 "Waterfall" – 3:32
 "After The Storm" – 2:46

Charts

References

External links
Carly Simon's Official Website

1975 songs
Songs written by Carly Simon
Carly Simon songs
Elektra Records singles
Song recordings produced by Richard Perry
1975 singles